Gaston is a masculine given name or surname. It may also refer to:

Places 
 Gaston, California, an unincorporated community
 Fort Gaston, California, founded in 1859, abandoned in 1892
 Gaston, Indiana, a town
 Gaston, North Carolina, a town
 Gaston County, North Carolina
 Gaston, Oregon, a city
 Gaston, South Carolina, a town
 Gaston, West Virginia, an unincorporated community
 A variant spelling of Gastun, present-day Bagras, a Crusader castle in Turkey
 Gaston (crater), an impact crater on the moon

Other uses
 Gaston (comics), a Belgian comic strip by André Franquin
 Gaston (climbing), the climbing technique named after Gaston Rébuffat
 Gaston (seal), a brown fur seal that escaped from the Prague Zoo during the 2002 European floods
 Gaston College, a community college in North Carolina
 "Gaston" (song), a song from Disney's Beauty and the Beast
 Tropical Storm Gaston, a number of named tropical cyclones